Dick Laan (18 December 1894, Wormerveer – 6 October 1973, Heemstede)   was a Dutch children's writer and film pioneer. He is best known for his Pinkeltje series.

Early career
Laan was the son of Jan Cornelis Laan and the grandson of Teunis Crok, the founders of the oil and fat processing company "Crok & Laan" (since 1971 part of Unilever). The Laan family moved in 1902 to Bloemendaal. Dick Laan started working in his father's factories in Wormerveer, and was included in the company's direction in 1916.

Films
When production at this factory temporarily dwindled during the First World War, he started spending more and more time on his main hobby, filming. He made his first movie in 1917 and another 50 movies and documentaries followed. He was the first to make children's movies, filmed with children he knew from his football club, Koninklijke HFC, and the scouting club De Zwarte Pijl where he was a Scout Leader.

In 1927 he founded with several other directors the Dutch Film Collective (De Nederlandsche Filmliga) (See ).

In 1929 he produced and directed the film Voetbal, the first artistic movie about the sport. The famous movie director Joris Ivens once stated that he had learned a lot from Dick Laan.

Books
His writing of screenplays for movies led to the writing of books. He first wrote a number of boy's juvenile (adventure) books

Pinkeltje

However Laan is by far best known for his Pinkeltje series of children books, featuring a pinky-sized hero. The first book was published in 1939 and went on to sell 3 million copies in Dutch. He would write another 28 entries in the series, though the last four volumes were published only posthumously. Translations of Pinkeltje have been made in English, Chinese, Danish,  Finnish, French, German, Norwegian, Portuguese, Swedish and Icelandic.

In popular culture

Films

In 1978, 5 years after Dick Laan's death, Harrie Geelen directed and wrote the screenplay for a movie about Pinkeltje, which was quite successful in the Netherlands and starred Aart Staartjes as Pinkeltje and Wieteke van Dort as his female companion Pinkelotje.

Legacy
Pinkeltje's popularity in the Netherlands is witnessed by the forty-plus nursery schools and kindergartens named Pinkeltje, Pinkelotje or after another character from the books.

Tributes
In Heemstede, where Laan spent the last years of his life, a street was named the Dick Laanlaan (laan = lane) in his honor, later changed to the "Laan van Dick Laan". Almere has also a Dick Laan street and in his birthplace Wormerveer is a Dick Laan square.

Bibliography
 Het Geheim van den Zwarten Monnik, 1930 ("The Secret of the Black Monk")
 De raad van zeven, 1930 ("The Council of Seven")
 Rudi's Spaansche avonturen, 1931 ("Rudy's Spanish Adventures")
 Circusjong, 1933 ("Circus Boy")
 De berg M, 1935 ("The Mountain M")
 Tarakanner tegen wil en dank, 1936 ("Unwillingly Shipmate of the Tarakan")
 Het goud van den Amerikaan, 1939 ("The Gold of the American")
 Pinkeltje-series, 1939–1977 (translated as "Fingerling")
 Dick Laan over Film. Herinneringen en belevenissen van een oud-filmer [1964] ("Memories of an old film maker")

References

External links
 
 The Meneer Dick Laan Fellowship
 Dick Laan at www.oudejeugdboeken.nl (search) 
 

1894 births
1973 deaths
Dutch children's writers
Dutch film producers
Dutch screenwriters
Dutch male screenwriters
People from Zaanstad
20th-century screenwriters